Torodora protrocha is a moth in the family Lecithoceridae. It was described by Edward Meyrick in 1916. It is found in southern India.

The wingspan is about 22 mm. The forewings are light brownish ochreous, suffusedly sprinkled with fuscous and dark fuscous, the discal area beyond the cell broadly clouded with fuscous. The stigmata are large, cloudy and blackish, the plical obliquely before the first discal. The hindwings are pale grey.

References

Moths described in 1916
Torodora